Lou Sanders (born ) is an English stand-up comedian, writer and actress from Broadstairs, Kent.

Early life
Sanders grew up in Broadstairs, Kent with her mother and her stepfather, a history teacher. Her father was periodically present. Sanders moved out at the age of 15, and later earned a degree in Communication and Cultural Studies from London Metropolitan University.

Career
Before beginning her career in comedy, Sanders worked in administrative roles, including as an executive PA and complaints handler at Ofcom. She took comedy classes from Logan Murray, and was paid to write a comedic blog about The Apprentice.

As a live performer, Sanders performs regularly both in the UK and around the world. In 2018, her show Shame Pig was the joint winner of the Comedians' Choice Award for Best Show at the Edinburgh Festival Fringe and she returned to the Festival in 2019 with her show Say Hello to Your New Step Mummy.

Sanders was declared the winner of the eighth series of Taskmaster in 2019; she has also appeared on television shows including QI, Would I Lie to You?, Travel Man, 8 Out of 10 Cats Does Countdown, Hypothetical, The Russell Howard Hour, Jon Richardson: Ultimate Worrier, Alan Davies: As Yet Untitled, 8 Out of 10 Cats, Red Nose Day for Comic Relief, Russell Howard's Good News, Live at the Electric and Question Team. She has also acted in sitcoms including Aisling Bea's This Way Up and Karl Pilkington's Sick of It. She is also a regular guest on BBC Radio 4's The Unbelievable Truth. In 2019, Sanders appeared on BBC Two's Live at the Apollo (series 15, episode 2).

As a writer, Sanders wrote and starred in Elderflower which co-starred Sheila Reid, Tom Rosenthal and Mike Wozniak. She has also written for 8 Out of 10 Cats, Mock the Week, Stand Up for the Week and Miranda Hart. Sanders has been an occasional guest host on the Elis and John Show on BBC Radio 5 Live. In February 2020, Sanders started hosting a podcast called The Cuddle Club. From February 2021, she has appeared in the Dave comedy panel show Mel Giedroyc: Unforgivable. In April 2022, Sanders started hosting Taskmaster: The People's Podcast.

Personal life

Sanders is teetotal and vegan.

References

External links

CV at agents' page

People from Broadstairs
English women writers
English stand-up comedians
Living people
Year of birth missing (living people)